Sark (Sercq) is one of the Channel Islands.

Sark or SARK may also refer to:

Places
 Sark, Razavi Khorasan, a village in Razavi Khorasan Province, Iran
 River Sark, which flows along the west end of the border between England and Scotland

Arts, entertainment, and media
 Julian Sark, a character from the TV series Alias
 Sark (Tron), a character in the Tron franchise
 a species of villainous robots from the TV series Hot Wheels Battle Force 5
 the overseer planet of The Currents of Space by Isaac Asimov

Military
 Battle of Sark, fought between England and Scotland in October 1448, by the River Sark
 SARK (Search And Rescue Knife), made by Emerson Knives, Inc. for the United States Navy
 SS-N-4 Sark, the NATO reporting name for the R-13 submarine-launched ballistic missile

Other uses
SARK (author), the pen name of author Susan Ariel Rainbow Kennedy
Steve Sarkisian, American college football coach
Tuttle Capital Short Innovation ETF (Nasdaq: SARK), American exchange-traded fund
Harvey Sark (1907–1964), American football player

See also
 Cutty Sark (disambiguation)
 Little Sark, a peninsula on the island of Sark
 Sark-French (or Sercquiais), the Norman dialect of the island of Sark
 
 Sarking, a term used in roof construction